is a Japanese manga series by Kanan Minami. Miseinen Dakedo Kodomo Janai was serialized in the semi-monthly  manga magazine Sho-Comi from December 5, 2012 to February 5, 2016. A live-action film adaptation of the same name was released on December 23, 2017 with the international title Teen Bride.

Plot

Karin Oriyama is a first-year high school student who has spent her entire life living in luxury and being spoiled by her father. She sets her sights on Nao Tsurugi, a popular third-year student at her school, and believes him to be the perfect candidate for her boyfriend. On her 16th birthday, Karin's father suddenly announces that she will be wed to Nao, who she had been secretly betrothed to since birth. Overjoyed with the news, Karin and Nao marry and move into a run-down apartment building to spend their newlywed life. To Karin's surprise, however, Nao confesses that he agreed to the marriage for financial independence, and he wants nothing to do with her. He proposes several rules for their co-habitance: they must not mention they are married at school; they must cook and clean after themselves; they must not enter each other's rooms; and they are allowed to date other people. Karin is crushed by the reality of her marriage, but she must overcome her ego and become more self-sufficient to earn Nao's respect.

Characters

; portrayed by: Yuna Taira (film)
Karin is a 16-year-old daughter from a nouveau riche family. Owing to her father spoiling her since childhood, Karin is initially arrogant and haughty, but she learns to take care of herself when she moves in to live with Nao. She has a positive outlook on life and is determined to make Nao fall in love with her.

; portrayed by: Kento Nakajima (film)
Nao is a third-year student who is popular at school for his friendly personality, high grades, and athleticism. He agrees to marry Karin only for financial gain and independence from his parents. After his parents' company became bankrupt, their fights have caused Nao to get occasional panic attacks and avoid getting into romantic relationships. Nao initially wants nothing to do with Karin, but he slowly becomes fond of her the more time they spend together.

; portrayed by: Yuri Chinen (film)
Isuzu is Karin's childhood friend, who she nicknames "Rin Rin." He is popular at school for his androgynous looks, but because Karin had always defended him from unwanted attention, he is in love with her. He resents Nao for marrying her, but he is often viewed as immature due to his selfishness and age. He is from a wealthy family with a highly influential background.

Portrayed by: Maika Yamamoto (film)
Saaya is Nao's ex-girlfriend.

Media

Manga

Miseinen Dakedo Kodomo Janai is written and illustrated by Kanan Minami. It was serialized in the semi-monthly magazine Sho-Comi from December 5, 2012 to February 5, 2016. The chapters were later released in 5 bound volumes by Shogakukan under the Flower Comics imprint. The series was published with the English subtitle "That is Not a Child, But a Minor."

Movie comic

A series of movie comics, featuring voiceovers to comic panels, was broadcast on dTV on September 8, 2017. The movie comic's theme song is "Shhh..." by lol.

Film

In June 2017, Sho-Comi announced that a live-action film adaptation was slated for a nationwide release in Japanese theaters on December 23, 2017. The film is directed by Tsutomu Hanabusa and stars Yuna Taira as Karin, Sexy Zone member Kento Nakajima as Nao, and Hey! Say! JUMP member Yuri Chinen as Isuzu. Maika Yamamoto was announced as an additional cast member in September 2017. The film's theme song is "White Love" by Hey! Say! JUMP. The film is also titled Teen Bride for international markets.

The film grossed  at box office after its 5th week in theaters. The Blu-ray home release sold a cumulative total of 6,354 copies in its first week.

Reception

The first volume of Miseinen Dakedo Kodomo Janai sold over 200,000 physical copies, making it one of Shogakukan's highest first printings. Volume 5 debuted at #15 on Oricon, selling 66,451 physical copies on its first week, and 96,032 physical copies overall.

Karin's character has been compared to Noa from Minami's older work, Rhapsody in Heaven. Minami acknowledged the difference in reactions Karin garnered compared to the more sympathetic responses from Kyō, Koi o Hajimemasu.

References

External links
 
 Official movie website
 

Live-action films based on manga
Manga adapted into films
Shōjo manga
Shogakukan manga
Japanese musical comedy films